Chanka Solomon Zimba (born 29 December 2001) is an English professional footballer who plays for Cardiff City, as a striker.

Early and personal life
Zimba was born in Zambia.

Career
Zimba began his career with Blackburn Rovers; he was released in summer 2020, and signed with Cardiff City in September 2020. He was called to the first-team for the first time in December 2020, due to injury problems and suspensions. He signed a new contract with the club in August 2021. He made his senior debut on 20 November 2021.

Zimba moved on on loan to Northampton Town in January 2022. In July 2022 he joined Newport County on loan for the 2022-23 season. Zimba made his debut for Newport on 30 July 2022 in the 1-1 League Two draw against Sutton United as a second half substitute. He scored his first goal for Newport on 9 August 2022 in the 3-2 EFL Cup first round win against Luton Town. He was released back to his parent club by Newport on 29 December 2022.

Career statistics

References

2001 births
Living people
English footballers
Blackburn Rovers F.C. players
Cardiff City F.C. players
Northampton Town F.C. players
Newport County A.F.C. players
English Football League players
Association football forwards
English people of Zambian descent
Zambian emigrants to the United Kingdom